The 1888 Florida gubernatorial election was held on November 6, 1888. Democratic nominee Francis P. Fleming defeated Republican nominee V. J. Shipman with 60.37% of the vote.

General election

Candidates
Francis P. Fleming, Democratic
V. J. Shipman, Republican

Results

References

1888
Florida
Gubernatorial